Local and regional bus services are a large part of public transport in the Helsinki region. HSL bus services include internal services in Helsinki, Espoo, Kauniainen, Vantaa, Kerava, Kirkkonummi, Sipoo, Siuntio and Tuusula and regional services between them.

Since 2010, the planning and timetabling of these bus routes has been done by Helsinki Region Transport, an organisation to which the aforementioned municipalities belong. Prior to HSL's inception, Helsinki's internal lines were the responsibility of Helsinki City Transport, with all other bus services being organised by YTV, HSL's predecessor.

The principles of line numbering 
Bus lines running solely inside the municipality of Helsinki have two-digit numbers, except for lines 52 and 53, which extend into Espoo, as well as trunk line 30 and night line 95N, both of which extend into Vantaa. Three-digit numbers are used by all other lines, except for Helsinki internal lines 500, 506, 554, 611B and 831, as well as part of Helsinki's minibus routes.

Some lines have a letter or two at the end of their number, for example 611B. This denotes that the line differs from the main route in some way. For example, the route of line 611B is shorter than that of line 611. These letters mean the following:
 A = a lengthened route, often to Kamppi, Elielinaukio or Rautatientori
 B = a shortened route (denotes an evening route for lines 82B and 85B)
 H = a tram route ending at Töölö, Koskela or Vallila depot
 K = a lengthier route through a smaller neighbourhood or termination somewhere different (denotes an evening and weekend route for line 553K)
 M = a metro replacement bus terminating at Mellunmäki.
 N = night line (line 345N also runs all day at weekends)
 R = a line operated by a robot bus (all lines have been discontinued)
 T = a lengthier route, often involving serving long cul-de-sacs or (occasionally) termination somewhere different (in the case of buses to southern Espoo this denoted going via Lauttasaari)
 V = a quicker route, usually going along more main roads, or via an industrial area, usually only during peak hours OR a metro replacement bus terminating at Vuosaari. 
 X = a metro, train or tram replacement bus
 Z = a quicker route, usually along more main roads or highways, again usually only during peak hours.

Operation hours 
The majority of lines run between 5:00 and 23:30, with more popular lines continuing until 1:30. Only a small amount of lines run between 1:30–5:00 on weekdays, mainly trunk lines and lines to/from Helsinki Airport.

Night lines run mainly on weekend nights between 1:00 and 4:00. This is the only time that most areas have a direct bus connection to central Helsinki, as most daytime bus lines are feeder lines to a train or metro station. Night lines in east and northeast Helsinki and southern Espoo are an exceptional case in the HSL area, as most lines in these areas tend to start operation between 23:00 and 00:30. Individual lines in other areas may also start at this time. The main reason for this is that the metro stops running at around 23:30, rendering feeder lines in east Helsinki and southern Espoo useless after this time.

Trunk, minibus and U lines 
Most buses in the HSL area run on the same principle. Most are blue at the front and white at the back, and carry multiple logos of both HSL and the actual operator of the bus. Electric buses also carry a cable and plug decal on each side. Boarding is through the front door only, where you show your ticket to the driver or card reader. Buses that operate on trunk lines, however, are orange at the front, instead of blue. Card readers are also provided at the middle doors (and rear doors on articulated buses), through which you may also board. These buses therefore work on a proof-of-payment system, like rail-based transport in the HSL area. They also do not stop at every bus stop, to speed up journey times, and they can run as frequently as every 6 minutes during the peak. Nowadays, most run until 2:00, with some running around the clock.

Not all areas have the traffic or road space to accommodate full-size buses. Therefore, some bus lines, like the 15 in Salmisaari or the 167 in Kauklahti, are run with smaller minibuses. These have a similar colour scheme to, and work on the same principle as normal HSL buses. These typically have around 15 seats. These same minibuses also run neighbourhood lines. These go up much smaller residential streets, utilising tight turning circles, and can stop anywhere on a road, as long as it is safe to do so.

U lines are normal long-distance buses or coaches that terminate in the HSL area, but also extend far outside it, to Hanko, Karis, Karkkila, Bromarv, Inkoo, Lohja, Nurmijärvi, Mäntsälä and Porvoo. The timetables and routes are decided by the operators of the route, usually Pohjolan Liikenne, Salon Tilausmatkat, Korsisaari or Pohjolan Liikenne, and/or the Centre for Economic Development, Transport and the Environment (Finnish: ELY-keskus). HSL tickets are accepted on these buses within the HSL area only. The operator's own tickets are accepted along the entire route.

Lines 

Many internal and regional lines have their central terminus in either Rautatientori or Elielinaukio, with the other in a residential area. Most lines in east Helsinki are feeder lines to metro stations: in this case, the central terminus is at a metro station. In north Helsinki and Espoo, as well as Vantaa, Kerava and Kirkkonummi, some lines operate as feeders for commuter rail stations, like Tikkurila, Kerava, Leppävaara, Myyrmäki and Espoon keskus.

There are also many lines that cross municipal borders in the HSL area. Most terminate at a local railway station, and act as feeder lines. Lines passing through Kauniainen are considered as Espoo internal lines.

Outside of the central areas, especially in Kirkkonummi, Sipoo and Siuntio, internal lines are focused mainly or entirely on commuting to school and work, and are heavily subsidised. Outside of peak hours, these lines run rarely, if at all. This makes them fairly useless for leisure travel.

The public transport provision and service level in Espoo, Vantaa and Kerava is not as good as that provided in southern Helsinki, but it is fairly good compared to the rest of Finland. In these areas, the public transport can be compared to that of Tampere and Turku, which are of a similar size.

Helsinki internal lines (two-digit lines) 
24h means that the line also operates on weekday nights (from 1:30-5:00):

These lines begin operation at around 23:30 and operate every day of the week:

These lines operate only on weekend nights between 2:00 and 4:30:

Lines in the direction of Länsiväylä (100 series) 

These lines begin operation at around 23:30 and operate every day of the week:

Lines in the direction of Turunväylä and Turuntie (200 series) 

These lines begin operation at around 23:30 and operate every day of the week:

Lines in the direction of Vihdintie (300 series) 

These lines begin operation at around 23:30 and operate every day of the week:

Lines in the direction of Hämeenlinnanväylä (400 series) 

These lines begin operation at around 23:30 and operate every day of the week:

Crosstown lines (500 series)

Lines in the direction of Tuusulanväylä (600 series) 

These lines start at 23:30 and operate every day of the week:

Minibus lines 
* means that the line is a neighbourhood line.

** All 914(T) services will run, if requested to do so, to the junction of Lappersintie and Ängsholmintie.

*** Certain 915A, B services will run, if requested to so, up Lieviöntie to the border with Lohja.

**** Certain 915B services will run, if requested to so, via Kahvimaa to the junction between Kavhimaantie and Kopulantie.

U lines 
* means that the line is run in this direction only.

Trunk lines

Depots 
Only buses used regularly in HSL traffic are counted.
 Espoo
 Finnoonniitty (ca. 45 buses, Pohjolan Liikenne)
 Suomenoja (ca. 75 buses, Pohjolan Liikenne ca. 45, Korsisaari ca.10, Åbergin Linja ca. 10)
 Klovi (ca. 200 buses, Nobina Finland)
 Helsinki
 Ruskeasuo (Ruha) (ca. 300 buses, Helsingin Bussiliikenne Oy)
 Vartiokylä (Varha) (ca. 50 buses, Helsingin Bussiliikenne Oy)
 Ilmala (ca. 200 buses, Pohjolan Liikenne)
 Roihupelto (ca. 65 buses, Nobina Finland)
 Tattarisuo (ca. 55 buses in two depots, Tammelundin Liikenne ca. 15, Transdev ca. 40)
 Koskela (ca. 20 buses, Transdev)
 Vantaa
 Kaivoksela (2 buses, Reissu Ruoti)
 Kuninkaanmäki (ca. 50 buses, Savonlinja)
 Ojanko (ca. 200 buses, Helsingin Bussiliikenne Oy)
 Rajatorppa (ca. 60 buses, Nobina Finland)
 Kerava
 Jäspilä (ca. 35 buses, Pohjolan Liikenne)

References 

Transport in Vantaa
Transport in Espoo
Transport in Helsinki
Bus transport in Finland